William Bolton , Prebendary and Treasurer of Cork was the Dean of Ross, Ireland  from 1630 until 1637.

References

Deans of Ross, Ireland
Year of birth missing
Year of death missing
17th-century Irish Anglican priests